A classical Kuiper belt object, also called a cubewano ( "QB1-o"), is a low-eccentricity Kuiper belt object (KBO) that orbits beyond Neptune and is not controlled by an orbital resonance with Neptune. Cubewanos have orbits with semi-major axes in the 40–50 AU range and, unlike Pluto, do not cross Neptune's orbit. That is, they have low-eccentricity and sometimes low-inclination orbits like the classical planets.

The name "cubewano" derives from the first trans-Neptunian object (TNO) found after Pluto and Charon: 15760 Albion, which until January 2018 had only the provisional designation (15760) 1992 QB1. Similar objects found later were often called "QB1-o's", or "cubewanos", after this object, though the term "classical" is much more frequently used in the scientific literature.

Objects identified as cubewanos include:
 15760 Albion (aka 1992 QB1 and gave rise to term 'Cubewano')
 136472 Makemake, the largest known cubewano and a dwarf planet 
 50000 Quaoar and 20000 Varuna, each considered the largest TNO at the time of discovery 
 19521 Chaos, 58534 Logos, 53311 Deucalion, 66652 Borasisi, 88611 Teharonhiawako
 486958 Arrokoth

136108 Haumea was provisionally listed as a cubewano by the Minor Planet Center in 2006, but was later found to be in a resonant orbit.

: 'hot' and 'cold' populations 

There are two basic dynamical classes of classical Kuiper-belt bodies: those with relatively unperturbed ('cold') orbits, and those with markedly perturbed ('hot') orbits.

Most cubewanos are found between the 2:3 orbital resonance with Neptune (populated by plutinos) and the 1:2 resonance. 50000 Quaoar, for example, has a near-circular orbit close to the ecliptic. Plutinos, on the other hand, have more eccentric orbits bringing some of them closer to the Sun than Neptune.

The majority of classical objects, the so-called cold population, have low inclinations (< 5°) and near-circular orbits, lying between 42 and 47 AU. A smaller population (the hot population) is characterised by highly inclined, more eccentric orbits. The terms 'hot' and 'cold' has nothing to do with surface or internal temperatures, but rather refer to the orbits of the objects, by analogy to molecules in a gas, which increase their relative velocity as they heat up.

The Deep Ecliptic Survey reports the distributions of the two populations; one with the inclination centered at 4.6° (named Core) and another with inclinations extending beyond 30° (Halo).

Distribution 
The vast majority of KBOs (more than two-thirds) have inclinations of less than 5° and eccentricities of less than 0.1 . Their semi-major axes show a preference for the middle of the main belt; arguably, smaller objects close to the limiting resonances have been either captured into resonance or have their orbits modified by Neptune.

The 'hot' and 'cold' populations are strikingly different: more than 30% of all cubewanos are in low inclination, near-circular orbits. The parameters of the plutinos’ orbits are more evenly distributed, with a local maximum in moderate eccentricities in 0.15–0.2 range, and low inclinations 5–10°.
See also the comparison with scattered disk objects.

When the orbital eccentricities of cubewanos and plutinos are compared, it can be seen that the cubewanos form a clear 'belt' outside Neptune's orbit, whereas the plutinos approach, or even cross Neptune's orbit. When orbital inclinations are compared, 'hot' cubewanos can be easily distinguished by their higher inclinations, as the plutinos typically keep orbits below 20°. (No clear explanation currently exists for the inclinations of 'hot' cubewanos.)

Cold and hot populations: physical characteristics 
In addition to the distinct orbital characteristics, the two populations display different physical characteristics.

The difference in colour between the red cold population, such as 486958 Arrokoth, and more heterogeneous hot population was observed as early as in 2002.
Recent studies, based on a larger data set, indicate the cut-off inclination of 12° (instead of 5°) between the cold and hot populations and confirm the distinction between the homogenous red cold population and the bluish hot population.

Another difference between the low-inclination (cold) and high-inclination (hot) classical objects is the observed number of binary objects. Binaries are quite common on low-inclination orbits and are typically similar-brightness systems. Binaries are less common on high-inclination orbits and their components typically differ in brightness. This correlation, together with the differences in colour, support further the suggestion that the currently observed classical objects belong to at least two different overlapping populations, with different physical properties and orbital history.

Toward a formal definition 
There is no official definition of 'cubewano' or 'classical KBO'. However, the terms are normally used to refer to objects free from significant perturbation from Neptune, thereby excluding KBOs in orbital resonance with Neptune (resonant trans-Neptunian objects). The Minor Planet Center (MPC) and the Deep Ecliptic Survey (DES) do not list cubewanos (classical objects) using the same criteria. Many TNOs classified as cubewanos by the MPC are classified as ScatNear (possibly scattered by Neptune) by the DES. Dwarf planet Makemake is such a borderline classical cubewano/scatnear object.  may be an inner cubewano near the plutinos. Furthermore, there is evidence that the Kuiper belt has an 'edge', in that an apparent lack of low-inclination objects beyond 47–49 AU was suspected as early as 1998 and shown with more data in 2001. Consequently, the traditional usage of the terms is based on the orbit's semi-major axis, and includes objects situated between the 2:3 and 1:2 resonances, that is between 39.4 and 47.8 AU (with exclusion of these resonances and the minor ones in-between).

These definitions lack precision: in particular the boundary between the classical objects and the scattered disk remains blurred. , there are 634 objects with perihelion (q) > 40 AU and aphelion (Q) < 47 AU.

DES classification 
Introduced by the report from the Deep Ecliptic Survey by J. L. Elliott et al. in 2005 uses formal criteria based on the mean orbital parameters. Put informally, the definition includes the objects that have never crossed the orbit of Neptune. According to this definition, an object qualifies as a classical KBO if:
 it is not resonant
 its average Tisserand's parameter with respect to Neptune exceeds 3
 its average eccentricity is less than 0.2.

SSBN07 classification 
An alternative classification, introduced by B. Gladman, B. Marsden and C. van Laerhoven in 2007, uses a 10-million-year orbit integration instead of the Tisserand's parameter. Classical objects are defined as not resonant and not being currently scattered by Neptune.

Formally, this definition includes as classical all objects with their current orbits that
are non-resonant (see the definition of the method)
have a semi-major axis greater than that of Neptune (30.1 AU; i.e. excluding centaurs) but less than 2000 AU (to exclude inner-Oort-cloud objects)
are not being scattered by Neptune
have their eccentricity  (to exclude detached objects)
Unlike other schemes, this definition includes the objects with major semi-axis less than 39.4 AU (2:3 resonance)—termed inner classical belt, or more than 48.7 (1:2 resonance) – termed outer classical belt, and reserves the term main classical belt for the orbits between these two resonances.

Families 
The first known collisional family in the classical Kuiper belt—a group of objects thought to be remnants from the breakup of a single body—is the Haumea family. It includes Haumea, its moons,  and seven smaller bodies.† The objects not only follow similar orbits but also share similar physical characteristics. Unlike many other KBO their surface contains large amounts of ice (H2O) and no or very little tholins. The surface composition is inferred from their neutral (as opposed to red) colour and deep absorption at 1.5 and 2. μm in infrared spectrum. Several other collisional families might reside in the classical Kuiper belt.

†As of 2008. The four brightest objects of the family are situated on the graphs inside the circle representing Haumea.

Exploration 

As of January 2019, only one classical Kuiper belt object has been observed up close by spacecraft. Both Voyager spacecraft have passed through the region before the discovery of the Kuiper belt. New Horizons was the first mission to visit a classical KBO.

List 

Here is a very generic list of classical Kuiper belt objects.

 15760 Albion
 20000 Varuna
 
 
 
 
 
 
 120347 Salacia
 
 
 
 148780 Altjira
 
 
 174567 Varda
 
 19521 Chaos
 
 
 
 
 
 486958 Arrokoth
 50000 Quaoar
 
 53311 Deucalion
 
 
 
 58534 Logos
 66652 Borasisi
 
 79360 Sila–Nunam
 
 
 
 
 88611 Teharonhiawako

See also 
 Lists of astronomical objects

Footnotes

References

External links